Thudiyalur railway station is a suburban railway station of Coimbatore.  It is a station in between Coimbatore and Mettupalayam. The station was reopened by Railway minister suresh prabhu. Recently Thudiyalur railway station building was refurbished and the station started functioning from July 3, 2017 onwards. Thudiyalur railway station is just 800 meter from Thudiyalur bus stand.

There is huge acres of land available for railways here, earlier CRPF Goodshed is planned near the railway station.

Administration
The station is operated by the Southern Railway zone of the Indian Railways and comes under the Salem railway division.

Lines
The station has one platform and a line connecting Mettupalayam and Coimbatore.

Services
This station handles local passenger MEMU trains between Mettupalayam railway station and Coimbatore Junction. It just takes 10 to 15 minutes to reach Coimbatore Junction and 25 minutes to reach Mettupalayam railway station from Thudiyalur railway station and fare is also just Rs.10 in both directions, after the covid now the fare is Rs.30. But "monthly pass" is just Rs.100 per person for both up and down trips to Coimbatore. 

Train timings at Thudiyalur station

References

Railway stations in Coimbatore